The following is a list of episodes for the television show Remington Steele; included are the many film references made throughout the series.

Series overview

Episodes

Season 1 (1982–83)

Season 2 (1983–84)

Season 3 (1984–85)

Season 4 (1985–86)

Season 5 (1987)

References
 

Remington Steele